Surfing in South Africa began in Durban in the 1940s.

History
By 1965 the South African Surfing Association was formed. In recent years surfing associations have tried to encourage more black South Africans to take up surfing.

South Africa was banned from most international surfing competitions due to apartheid.

Famous surf spots

Muizenberg
This beach is the home of surfing in South Africa and may be the oldest surfing venue in Africa. Heather Price is considered to be the first ever person recorded to stand-up surf with a photo appearing in a local newspaper in 1919. The modern surfing movement in South Africa was in essence founded by a woman, who was born in Zimbabwe.

Jeffreys Bay
Jeffreys Bay is one of the five most famous surfing destinations (no.2 on one "best in the world" surfing list) in the world and hosts the annual Billabong Pro ASP World Tour surfing event at Super Tubes during July.

St Francis Bay
A right hand point wave at St. Francis Bay was first idolised and promoted in the cult classic surf movie The Endless Summer in the 1960s

References